When Time Ran Out... is a 1980 American disaster film directed by James Goldstone and starring Paul Newman, Jacqueline Bisset and William Holden.  The supporting cast features James Franciscus, Ernest Borgnine, Red Buttons, Burgess Meredith, Valentina Cortese, Veronica Hamel, Pat Morita, Edward Albert and Barbara Carrera.

Produced by Irwin Allen, When Time Ran Out...s screenplay by Carl Foreman and Stirling Silliphant is marginally based on the 1969 novel The Day the World Ended by Gordon Thomas and Max Morgan-Witts detailing the factual 1902 volcanic eruption of Mount Pelée on Martinique, which killed 30,000 people in five minutes by pyroclastic flow.

It marked the second and final time Newman and Holden appeared in a film together following the box office triumph of The Towering Inferno six years prior, as well as reuniting Borgnine and Buttons from The Poseidon Adventure. When Time Ran Out..., however, was a commercial flop and Allen's last theatrical release and is often regarded as the final 1970s era disaster film. The film was a critical and commercial disappointment. Paul Zastupnevich's work on the film was recognized by a nomination for the Academy Award for Best Costume Design .

Plot
Shelby Gilmore (William Holden), who owns a newly constructed hotel on a remote Pacific island, wants desperately to marry his secretary, Kay Kirby (Jacqueline Bisset) and proposes to her under the impression that she'll become his seventh wife. Kay is in love with Hank Anderson (Paul Newman), an oil rigger whose scientists are warning him that the island's active volcano, Mauna Lani, is about to erupt.

Shelby's partner, Bob Spangler (James Franciscus), assures guests at the hotel that the threat of the volcano is a total exaggeration, explaining that it only erupts once every thousand years. Spangler is married to Shelby's goddaughter Nikki (Veronica Hamel), but is cheating on her with Iolani (Barbara Carrera), an executive with Shelby's hotel. Iolani is engaged to Brian (Edward Albert), the hotel's general manager. Unbeknownst to all except Spangler, who chooses not to reveal the secret, Brian is his illegitimate younger half-brother and therefore part-owner of the resort.

Guests at the hotel include a bonds smuggler, Francis Fendly (Red Buttons), who is being tailed by a New York City private investigator, Tom Conti (Ernest Borgnine). Also on hand are Rene and Rose Valdez (Burgess Meredith and Valentina Cortese), who are retired circus tightrope walkers. Hank's oil rig workers include Tiny Baker (Alex Karras), who has a wager going with cockfighting rival Sam (Pat Morita) on a prized rooster that has just been delivered to him. Sam and his wife Mona (Sheila Allen) own a local bar on the opposite side of the island from the resort, closer to the volcano.

Hank and Kay go for a picnic on the beach to discuss their relationship. During their time together, the volcano erupts and most of the island's population are wiped out. Tiny and all of Hank's workers are killed in town when a tsunami generated by Mauna Lani's eruption suddenly strikes. Sam takes Mona and two of his "bar girls," Delores and Marsha, and escapes by car, while Hank and Kay rescue Nikki and some others at stables in the path of the eruption by helicopter. The only survivors are those at Shelby's hotel, ignoring a disaster that will surely come straight for them, as the volcano is spewing fireballs. Small fireballs land at the hotel, and Conti is burned and blinded by one of them, to Fendly's horror. Conti is told by the paramedics that the injury is superficial, and given time to heal, he will regain his eyesight. Some of the hotel guests panic and try to escape by stealing the helicopter, but it soon crashes, killing all those inside.

Hank insists that everyone must evacuate the hotel and journey to a safe side of the island to await rescue. Spangler convinces the majority of the guests to stay, including mistress Iolani. Shelby bids a farewell to Nikki, who insists on staying with her husband. After one final attempt to persuade others to join them, Hank and Kay leave the hotel along with Shelby, Brian, Rene and Rose, Fendly and Conti, Sam, Mona and the girls, plus a few more. At the hotel, Nikki stumbles upon her husband's affair with Iolani, but now it is too late for her to follow the others though Spangler expels her from the hotel.

Trucks carrying survivors manage to travel as far as a mountainside gorge, where the road has fallen away. Everyone must cross the gorge on foot. Conti is guided by Fendly, and the two become friends. From there, the party comes upon a rickety wooden bridge over a river of molten lava. Hank crosses first to see if it is safe. The others go in pairs. Two native children, whose father died crossing the gorge, are afraid and run away. Rose, who had stopped to rest with Rene because of her weak heart, dies after telling her husband to find the children.

After an explosion beneath the bridge causes Sam and Marsha to fall to their deaths into the lava, Rene hoists a child onto his back and recreates his old tightrope act to get the child safely across. Hank guides the second child to safety. The survivors take refuge in a cavern, during which time large fireballs streak across the sky. Spangler pays for his arrogance when one huge fireball arcs directly towards the hotel; destroying it and killing him, Nikki, Iolani and all who chose to stay. The next morning, the survivors continue on to the beach to wait for rescue from two ships, previously dispatched by Fiji.

Cast
 Paul Newman as Hank Anderson
 Jacqueline Bisset as Kay Kirby
 William Holden as Shelby Gilmore
 Edward Albert as Brian
 Red Buttons as Francis Fendly
 Barbara Carrera as Iolani
 Valentina Cortese as Rose Valdez
 Veronica Hamel as Nikki Spangler
 Alex Karras as "Tiny" Baker
 Burgess Meredith as Rene Valdez
 Ernest Borgnine as Tom Conti
 James Franciscus as Bob Spangler
 John Considine as Webster
 Sheila Allen as Mona
 Pat Morita as Sam
 Lonny Chapman as Kelly
 Sandy Kenyon as Henderson
 Ava Readdy as Delores
 Glynn Rubin as Marsha

Production

Development
The Day the World Ended, by English television writers Gordon Thomas and Max Morgan-Witts, was a 1969 non-fiction account of the disastrous eruption of Mount Pelée in Martinique in 1902, which killed 30,000 people. It was called "literally impossible to put down" by the New York Times.  Film rights were bought by Irwin Allen. In 1975, Allen was riding high on the success of The Poseidon Adventure and The Towering Inferno. He announced he would make a film of Day the World Ended along with Poseidon II and Circus. He announced he had signed a two-picture deal with Warner Bros, but would still make those three films for Fox.

Allen began to prepare The Swarm but also started pre-production on Day in Hawaii. Filming was to start in March 1976 with a view to the film being ready by Christmas 1976.

Then Alan Ladd Jr., head of Fox, decided that the disaster cycle had peaked and decided not to finance the films. Allen took his projects to Warner Bros.

Allen hired Carl Foreman to write the script "for more money than I'd ever heard of before." By this time the project was no longer a historical dramatization of the Mount Pelée eruption, but had become a contemporary, fictional account of a resort hotel built near an active volcano.

Allen raised his biggest budget to date for the film, $20 million. Warner Bros. told Allen that the film could have a large budget on one condition: that Allen himself not direct it. Several of the actors who appeared in the movie, including Paul Newman and Ernest Borgnine, didn't like the script but signed on because they were contractually bound to doing one last movie with Allen, and wanted to get their obligations over with.

Shooting
Filming started 8 February 1979 on the Big Island of Hawaii. The primary location was the Kona Surf Resort (today known as the Outrigger Kona Resort and Spa), which served as the film's fictional Kalaleu Gilmore Hotel. The exterior scenes of Bob Spangler walking on the floor of the volcano were shot at both the Kilauea Iki crater, and the Halemaʻumaʻu Crater (which was radically altered during the April, 2018 eruption).  The scenes of the convoy of vehicles escaping were largely filmed on Old Mamalahoa highway, near the Hawai'i Tropical Botanical Garden. The film was rife with production problems. While it was initially budgeted at $20,000,000, Warner Bros. cut the budget drastically half way through the production, compromising the remaining filming, and notably, the critical special effects work.  Legendary special effects technician L.B. Abbott, who had helmed effects for Allen's previous box office hits, The Poseidon Adventure and The Towering Inferno, had very little budget left to produce the effects, resulting in sub-standard results (a more elaborate volcano model and matte paintings were planned, but scrapped due to budget, as was a miniature of the hotel complex which was to be exploded for the finale).  During filming, Holden, who was ill and battling alcoholism, was sidelined by director Goldstone for being under the influence of alcohol, and presenting a danger to himself and others during complicated a stunt sequence involving a bridge. Newman, contractually obliged to do another Allen film after Inferno, was unenthusiastic about appearing. In a 1998 interview with Larry King, when asked if he ever regretted making any film, Newman bitterly responded "that volcano movie." However, it is believed his salary for this film was used to start up his Newman's Own company.

Release and Reception
When Time Ran Out... was released ten days after the Mount St. Helens volcanic eruption, on March 28, 1980, and performed poorly at the box office. The film grossed only $3,763,988, against a $10,000,000 budget. Film critic Leonard Maltin's annual publication of capsule film reviews dubbed the film "When Ideas Ran Out" or "The Blubbering Inferno". A story in TV Guide observed that "with cheesy special effects (even the volcano isn't convincing, considering the film cost $20 million) and a hole-ridden script, this film offers precious little to like."

Gene Siskel and Roger Ebert selected the film as one of their "dogs of the year" in a 1980 episode of Sneak Previews.

The film was nominated for an Academy Award for Best Costume Design.

Alternate versions
Because the film performed badly at the US box office, Warner Brothers insisted on cuts for the international theatrical release, reducing it from 121 minutes down to 104 minutes. All DVD releases of the film have been the shortened international version.

In 1986 and 1994, Warner Brothers Home Video released an extended version on VHS in the U.S. that was 144 minutes long. Deleted scenes and additional footage were restored when Earth's Final Fury (the film's TV title) debuted on network television. It was released with the notice 'EXPANDED VIDEO EDITION' on the video box with some of the additional scenes retaining their sporadic "fade to black" commercial edits.

Material from the restored footage included more screen time for the love triangle between Franciscus, Carrera and Albert plus expanded Albert's role, which is little more than a cameo in the edited two-hour version. Scenes involving Karras' cockfighting exploits at Sam's and Mona's bar were also added. In the original theatrical release the cockfighting subplot is nearly gone.

The caravan sequence where trucks make their way through the island is trimmed in the theatrical version and the death of Cortese is not shown onscreen. It features scenes that didn't make it to the longer video edition: a humorous one where a winded Borgnine chases a jogging Buttons plus a longer introduction to the characters of Franciscus and Hamel. A precarious ledge scene is slightly longer (and employs a shot of the dead farmer at the bottom of the cavern), as are shots of the survivors hiking through the jungle.

In order to escape its notorious flopping at the Box Office...4+ years later, when it was finally cleared to air on TV, the film was retitled Earth's Final Fury.

References

External links

1980 films
1980s adventure films
1980s disaster films
American disaster films
Films directed by James Goldstone
Films produced by Irwin Allen
Films based on British novels
Films set in Oceania
Films set on islands
Films shot in Hawaii
Films about volcanoes
Films about tsunamis
Films scored by Lalo Schifrin
Films with screenplays by Carl Foreman
Films with screenplays by Stirling Silliphant
Warner Bros. films
Cockfighting in film
1980s English-language films
1980s American films